The Curse of the Moon Child is a 1972 American horror film starring Adam West, Sherry Jackson, and Jeremy Slate. Its plot focuses on a Victorian-era English village whose children born under the astrological sign of Cancer are compelled to join a demonic union.

Background
Little is known about the film's production or availability, and it was described by writers Harvey Fenton and David Flint in Ten Years of Terror: British Horror Films of the 1970s (2001) as "an obscure film [that] has former Batman Adam West battling a Satanic cult who specialise in human sacrifice." The film was shot in 16mm around 1972.

The Waterloo Courier lists the film as having aired on television on October 21, 1977. It screened on late-night television the following week in Cedar Rapids, Iowa, on October 28, 1977.

Reception
Sandra Brennan of the AllMovie Guide awarded the film a two-and-a-half out of five star-rating.

References

External links
 
 

1972 films
American supernatural horror films
Films about astrology
Films about cults
Films about curses
1970s lost films
Lost American films